In geometry, the order-6 pentagonal tiling is a regular tiling of the hyperbolic plane. It has Schläfli symbol of {5,6}.

Uniform coloring 
This regular tiling can also be constructed from [(5,5,3)] symmetry alternating two colors of pentagons, represented by t1(5,5,3).

Symmetry 
This tiling represents a hyperbolic kaleidoscope of 6 mirrors defining a regular hexagon fundamental domain, and 5 mirrors meeting at a point. This symmetry by orbifold notation is called *33333 with 5 order-3 mirror intersections.

Related polyhedra and tiling 

This tiling is topologically related as a part of sequence of regular tilings with order-6 vertices with Schläfli symbol {n,6}, and Coxeter diagram , progressing to infinity.

References

 John H. Conway, Heidi Burgiel, Chaim Goodman-Strass, The Symmetries of Things 2008,  (Chapter 19, The Hyperbolic Archimedean Tessellations)

See also

Square tiling
Uniform tilings in hyperbolic plane
List of regular polytopes

External links 

 Hyperbolic and Spherical Tiling Gallery
 KaleidoTile 3: Educational software to create spherical, planar and hyperbolic tilings
 Hyperbolic Planar Tessellations, Don Hatch

Hyperbolic tilings
Isogonal tilings
Isohedral tilings
Order-6 tilings
Pentagonal tilings
Regular tilings